Mount Craig, is the second highest peak of the Appalachian Mountains and second only to  Mount Mitchell in eastern North America. It is located in the Black Mountains in Yancey County, North Carolina. The mountain lies about a mile (2 km) north of Mount Mitchell and is within Mount Mitchell State Park and the Pisgah National Forest.

Mount Craig was named in honor of Locke Craig, the governor of North Carolina from 1913 to 1917 responsible for establishing Mount Mitchell State Park in 1915 as the state's first, thereby protecting the area from excessive logging.

Trails
The mountain can easily be reached via an approximately 45-minute hike on the Deep Gap Trail from the picnic area below the summit of Mount Mitchell off N.C. Highway 128. The view atop Mount Craig embraces much of the southern portion of the Black Mountain Range. A North Carolina Geodetic Survey triangulation marker is located on the summit.

The Deep Gap Trail proceeds beyond Mount Craig to other North Carolina high peaks including Big Tom, Cattail Peak, Balsam Cone, Potato Knob and through Deep Gap to Winter Star Mountain, Gibbs Mountain and Celo Knob.

Elevation designation

Formerly the third highest point in mainland eastern North America, Mount Craig is currently designated by the USGS as the second. However, there is only a 4-foot (1.3 m) difference in elevation between it and 6,643-foot (2,025 m) Clingmans Dome, the highest point in the Great Smoky Mountains. Clingmans Dome's elevation is based on a conventional 1920 optical survey.  

Mount Craig's elevation was revised upwards in 1993 based upon satellite GPS to an accuracy of 4 inches (10 centimeters). Until Clingmans Dome can be remeasured by GPS, Mount Craig retains its designation as second highest.

See also
Mount Mitchell State Park
Mountain peaks of North America
Mountain peaks of the United States
List of mountains in North Carolina

References

 Mount Mitchell State Park. Mount Craig: Credits. Retrieved Mar. 27, 2008.
 Tarheel High Points. Mount Craig: Credits. Retrieved Mar. 27, 2008.

External links 

 Mount Mitchell State Park
 Sherpa Guide to the Black Mountains

Craig
Craig
Protected areas of Yancey County, North Carolina
Landmarks in North Carolina
Pisgah National Forest
Mountains of Yancey County, North Carolina